RIAI may refer to:

 Royal Institute of the Architects of Ireland
 Recursively-improving artificial intelligence, recursive self-improvement ability of artificial intelligence